Malacorhynchus is a genus of duck within the family Anatidae. It was established in 1831 by English ornithologist William John Swainson, when he proposed moving the pink-eared duck into a subgenus (Malacorhynchus) based on unique characters of its beak and toes. The genus contains one living and one extinct species.

List of species
Pink-eared duck (M. membranaceus) 
†Scarlett's duck (M. scarletti) – extinct

References

Ducks
Anatinae
Bird genera
Bird genera with one living species